Bishop Marián Andrej Pacák, C.Ss.R. (born 24 April 1973) is a Canadian Slovak Greek Catholic hierarch, who served as the third Eparchial Bishop of the Slovak Catholic Eparchy of Saints Cyril and Methodius of Toronto from 5 July 2018 until his resignation on 20 October 2020.

Life
Pacák was born in a Greek-Catholic family in the Prešov Region of the Eastern Slovakia. After his graduation from high-school, he joined the Congregation of the Most Holy Redeemer on 16 August 1991.

Pacák made his solemn profession as a Redemptorist on 16 August 1997. After completing his studies in philosophy and theology at the Major Redemptorists Theological Seminary in Tuchów, Poland, and at the Pontifical Theological Academy in Kraków, Poland, he was ordained a priest on 16 August 1997.

After ordination Pacák served as a parish priest in Stará Ľubovňa (1998–2001, 2008–2015) and in Michalovce (2004–2008). During 2001–2004 he interrupted his pastoral work to study at the Alphonsian Academy in Rome where he earned a licentiate in moral theology. From 2015 to 2018 he served at the parish in Vranov nad Topľou.

On 5 July 2018, Pacák was appointed the Eparchial Bishop of the Slovak Catholic Eparchy of Saints Cyril and Methodius of Toronto by Pope Francis. His episcopal consecration took place in the Basilica of the Descent of the Holy Spirit in Michalovce, Slovakia, on 2 September 2018, and he was installed in Toronto on 15 September.

Pope Francis accepted Pacák's resignation on 20 October 2020. Bishop emeritus returned to Slovakia and is residing in the Redemptorist community in Stará Ľubovňa.

References

External links

1973 births
Living people
People from Levoča
Redemptorists
Redemptorist bishops
Pontifical University of John Paul II alumni
Alphonsian Academy alumni
Slovak Eastern Catholics
Slovak Greek Catholic bishops
Canadian Eastern Catholic bishops
21st-century Eastern Catholic bishops